The following are the 51 municipalities of the canton of Jura, as of 2023.

List 

 Alle
 Basse-Allaine
 Beurnevésin
 Boécourt
 Boncourt
 Bonfol
 Bourrignon
 Bure
 Châtillon (JU)
 Clos du Doubs
 Coeuve
 Cornol
 Courchapoix
 Courchavon
 Courgenay
 Courrendlin
 Courroux
 Courtedoux
 Courtételle
 Damphreux-Lugnez
 Delémont
 Develier
 Ederswiler
 Fahy
 Fontenais
 Grandfontaine
 Haute-Ajoie
 Haute-Sorne
 La Baroche
 Lajoux (JU)
 Le Bémont (JU)
 Le Noirmont
 Les Bois
 Les Breuleux
 Les Enfers
 Les Genevez (JU)
 Mervelier
 Mettembert
 Montfaucon
 Movelier
 Muriaux
 Pleigne
 Porrentruy
 Rossemaison
 Saignelégier
 Saint-Brais
 Saulcy
 Soubey
 Soyhières
 Val Terbi
 Vendlincourt

References

 
Canton of Jura
Jura